Forest Township is the name of some places in the U.S. state of Minnesota:
Forest Township, Becker County, Minnesota
Forest Township, Rice County, Minnesota

See also: Forest Township (disambiguation)

Minnesota township disambiguation pages